Great Lakes Mall is a shopping mall in Mentor, Ohio on Mentor Avenue (U.S. Route 20), approximately  northeast of Cleveland. The mall now has 126 stores. The anchor stores are Round 1 Entertainment, Dillard's, Planet Fitness, JCPenney, and Dick's Sporting Goods. There are 3 vacant anchor stores that were once Sears, Firestone and Macy's. The mall was opened in 1961 as the first developed by Ohio's Edward J. DeBartolo Sr.  Later, the mall was expanded to become one of the oldest major enclosed shopping malls in Ohio. Olive Garden, BJ's Brewhouse, Hobby Lobby, Outback Steakhouse, Barnes & Noble and Atlas Cinemas Stadium 16 are located in the mall parking lot. The mall contains . On May 28, 2014, it was announced by Simon Property Group that they would transfer Great Lakes Mall to its new spin off Washington Prime Group. Washington Prime Group later became WP Glimcher and then back to Washington Prime Group. In 2015, Sears Holdings spun off 235 of its properties, including the Sears at Great Lakes Mall, into Seritage Growth Properties. Dillard's North closed in May 2017, consolidating the men and women's sections into one building.  Sears closed in September 2017 due to the store's lease ending. On January 6, 2021, it was announced that Macy's would be closing in April 2021 as part of a plan to close 46 stores nationwide.

Anchors
Dick's Sporting Goods ( - new building added in 2014)
Dillard's 
JCPenney
Round One Entertainment ( - entire first floor of former Dillard's north building)

Former Anchors
Higbee's (1969-1992) (became Dillard's South in 1992)
Horne's (1974-1992) (became Dillard's North in 1992)
May Company (1964-1993) (became Kaufmann's in 1993)
Kaufmann's (1993-2006) (became Macy's in 2006)
Dillard's (North) (1992-2017) (Consolidated to Dillard's South in May 2017)
Sears (1970-2017)
Macy's (2006-2021)

References

External links
 Great Lakes Mall Website

Washington Prime Group
Shopping malls in Ohio
Mentor, Ohio
Buildings and structures in Lake County, Ohio
Tourist attractions in Lake County, Ohio
Shopping malls established in 1961